Ferenta is a genus of moths in the family Erebidae.

Species
 Ferenta cacica Guenée, 1852
 Ferenta castula Dognin, 1912
 Ferenta incaya Hampson, 1926
 Ferenta stolliana Stoll in Cramer, 1782

References
Natural History Museum Lepidoptera genus database
World Checklist of Tribe Calpini (Lepidoptera: Noctuidae: Calpinae)

Calpinae
Moth genera